SR-18 may refer to:

A synthetic cannabinoid also known as BTM-8
State Route 18